The Wisconsin–Eau Claire Blugolds football program is the intercollegiate American football team for the University of Wisconsin–Eau Claire located in the U.S. state of Wisconsin.

Notable former players
Notable alumni include:
 Roman Brumm
 Kevin Fitzgerald
 Lee Weigel

References

 
American football teams established in 1917
1917 establishments in Wisconsin